Courtemanche is a surname. It is believed to have originated in the area of Maine, France. There are several known variations of the name, including Courdemanges, Courdemanche, and Courtemanchie.

Notable people with the surname include:

David Courtemanche (born 1964), Canadian politician
Gil Courtemanche (1943–2011), Canadian journalist and writer
Henri Courtemanche (1916–1986), Canadian politician
Michel Courtemanche (born 1964), Canadian comedian and actor

References

French-language surnames